Platycerium coronarium is an epiphytic species of staghorn fern in the genus Platycerium. It is found in maritime Southeast Asia and Indochina. and throughout the East Indies.

References

coronarium
Flora of Singapore